Daniel Xuereb (born 22 June 1959) is a French former professional footballer who played as a striker. He earned eight international caps for France during the 1980s, scoring one goal. As a player of RC Lens (1981–1986), he appeared for France in the 1986 FIFA World Cup, after France won the gold medal match at the 1984 Summer Olympics in Los Angeles, California, scoring in the match himself.

Xuereb has the distinction of completing for FIFA and World Cup history having at least one player listed for each character of the Latin alphabet. 'X' was the last character needed to complete the list.

He coached CA Digne and Pertuis in the 1990s, and AS Aix from 2008 to 2009.

References

External links
 
 
 
 

1959 births
Living people
Sportspeople from Aix-en-Provence
French people of Maltese descent
French people of Sicilian descent
French footballers
Association football forwards
France international footballers
1986 FIFA World Cup players
Olympic footballers of France
Olympic gold medalists for France
Footballers at the 1984 Summer Olympics
Olympique Lyonnais players
RC Lens players
Paris Saint-Germain F.C. players
Montpellier HSC players
Olympique de Marseille players
SC Toulon players
Ligue 1 players
French football managers
Olympic medalists in football
Medalists at the 1984 Summer Olympics
Pays d'Aix FC managers
Footballers from Provence-Alpes-Côte d'Azur